Edmund Jones (1918–2019) was an American politician in the state of Pennsylvania.

Edmund Jones may also refer to:

E. E. Jones (Edmund Evans Jones), American football coach
Edmund Britten Jones (1888–1953), Australian physician
Edmund Jones (MP), MP for Breconshire 1654 and 1659

See also

Edward Jones (disambiguation)
Edgar Jones (disambiguation)
Edwin Jones (disambiguation)